Mark's Stadium is a former soccer stadium located in North Tiverton, Rhode Island. During the 1920s and early 1930s it was the home of Fall River Marksmen, one of the era’s most successful soccer teams. It is one of the earliest examples of a soccer-specific stadium in the United States. After the demise of the Marksmen, the stadium was used as a home ground by other local teams, most notably Fall River F.C. and Ponta Delgada S.C.

History
In 1922 Sam Mark took over Fall River United of the American Soccer League and renamed them Fall River Marksmen. Mark was willing to invest in the club and one of his first moves was to build the team its own stadium. He located it in North Tiverton, Rhode Island, just over the Massachusetts border from Fall River. This enabled the Marksmen to circumvent the Massachusetts Blue Laws and play on a Sunday. Although used primarily for soccer, Mark’s also operated a semi-professional baseball team and the stadium’s design was decidedly baseball-friendly. This included an L-shaped stand which was placed behind one of the corner-flags.  The stadium also incorporated a small dirt track for auto racing up until the early 1950s which somewhat reduced the size of the soccer pitch.

The 1925 National Challenge Cup final and the first Lewis Cup final were both held at the stadium. Although a crowd of only 1,000 turned up to see Shawsheen Indians defeat Canadian Club of Chicago 3-0 in the Challenge Cup on April 19, a capacity crowd of 15,000 saw Boston Wonder Workers defeat Fall River Marksmen 2-1 in the Lewis Cup. In subsequent seasons the stadium regularly hosted prestige friendlies between the Marksmen and visiting teams such as Rangers, an Italian League XI and Kilmarnock.

In 1931, after Sam Mark relocated Fall River Marksmen to New York and renamed them the New York Yankees, he made the stadium available to anybody willing to place a team there. A group of Fall River businessmen, led by an ex-Marksmen player Harold Brittan, bought Providence Gold Bugs and moved them to Mark's Stadium where they played as Fall River F.C. During their brief stay the new tenants beat both Vélez Sérsfield and  Celtic in prestige  friendlies. In the 1940s and 1950s Ponta Delgada S.C. also played some home games at the stadium.

In the 1950s, the stadium was torn down, and was replaced by a drive-in movie theater, as well as a large restaurant and banquet hall in the former parking area run by the Ponta Delgada Club. The theater was closed for a time in the 1970s, and by the early 1980s it was closed for good.  The screen was torn down in the decades to follow, and the site of the stadium itself is now a large empty lot behind the former Ponta Delgada Restaurant, which is now partially closed itself.

Notable games

References

Fall River Marksmen
Ponta Delgada S.C.
Defunct soccer venues in the United States
Baseball venues in Rhode Island
Soccer venues in Rhode Island
Buildings and structures in Tiverton, Rhode Island
Demolished buildings and structures in Rhode Island